Tokasa Seniyasi (born 10 July 1999) is a Fijian rugby sevens player. She was originally to compete in the women's tournament at the 2020 Summer Olympics, but had to withdraw due to injury.

References

1999 births
Living people
Female rugby sevens players
Place of birth missing (living people)